Here's Flash Casey is a 1937 American film directed by Lynn Shores and starring Eric Linden and Boots Mallory.

Plot
Flash Casey is able finally to get the job as photographer at Globe Press. And he would like to marry newspaper woman Kay Lanning. Some blackmailing-crooks are stealing pictures from people who bring them in to be developed in the shop run by the same crooks, to blackmail socialites. Then Kay is kidnapped and Flash is able with some help to find her.

Cast
Eric Linden as "Flash" Casey
Boots Mallory as Kay Lanning
Cully Richards as Tom Wade
Holmes Herbert as Major Rodney Addison
Joseph Crehan as Blaine (City Editor)
Howard Lang as "Pop" Lawrence
Victor Adams as "King" Ricker
Harry Harvey as Gus Payton
Suzanne Kaaren as Mitzi LaRue
Matty Kemp as Rodney Addison Jr.
Dorothy Vaughan as Mrs.O'Hara (Landlady)
Maynard Holmes as Joe (Roommate)
 unbilled players include Sven Hugo Borg, Lynton Brent, Don Brodie, Leonard Carey, Virginia Dabney, and Spec O'Donnell

See also
Casey, Crime Photographer

References

External links

1937 films
American mystery films
American black-and-white films
Grand National Films films
1937 mystery films
Films directed by Lynn Shores
1930s English-language films
1930s American films